Łukasz Michalski (born 2 August 1988 in Bydgoszcz) is a retired Polish pole vaulter. His biggest achievement is the fourth place at the 2011 World Championships in Daegu with the personal best of 5.85 metres. He also won the gold medal at the 2011 Summer Universiade and was a finalist at the 2012 Summer Olympics in London.

In July 2014, he married Polish triple jumper Anna Jagaciak. Michalski officially ended his sporting career in 2015 to concentrate on his work as a doctor.

Achievements

References

 

1988 births
Living people
Polish male pole vaulters
Sportspeople from Bydgoszcz
Athletes (track and field) at the 2012 Summer Olympics
Olympic athletes of Poland
Universiade medalists in athletics (track and field)
Zawisza Bydgoszcz athletes
Universiade gold medalists for Poland
Medalists at the 2011 Summer Universiade
21st-century Polish people